Andreas Rasch Christensen (born June 2, 1971) is a Danish education researcher and director of research and development in the division of Education and Social Sciences at VIA University College.

Early life and education 
Rasch-Christensen was born in Kolding and grew up in Haderslev. He earned his Cand.mag. in English and social studies at Aarhus University in 1998 and a PhD in 2009 from its Institute of Education and Teacher Training, .

Career
From 1998 to 2007, he was lector of teacher education in Skive (now a part of VIA University College). In 2007, he became director of education, and in 2010, director of research and development for VIA's division of  Education and Social Sciences.

His research focuses on primary schools, and he frequently appears in media debates on primary education. He is an expert on inclusion of special-needs children. In the 1990s he was also active in investigating the unexpectedly poor showing of Danish children in the Programme for International Student Assessment. In his position as divisional director of research, he has spoken about teacher training as well as student learning.

Rasch-Christensen has participated in many consultative bodies under the Danish Ministry of Education, including the Rådet for Børns Læring.

Personal life
Rasch-Christensen blogged about football for TV 2 until 2015, when accusations of plagiarism were raised concerning a book he published about football, and some passages in blog entries.

He lives in Aarhus with his wife and their two children.

References

External links
 Faculty page at VIA

1971 births
Living people
People from Kolding
Danish educators
Danish educational theorists